Ariel Hernández (born March 2, 1992) is a Dominican former professional baseball pitcher. He previously played in Major League Baseball (MLB) for the Cincinnati Reds.

Career

San Francisco Giants
Hernández signed with the San Francisco Giants as an international free agent on September 4, 2008. He made his professional debut in 2009 with the Dominican Summer League Giants, with whom he recorded a 6-1 record and 3.64 ERA in 13 games. He returned to the team in 2010, where he posted a 2.01 ERA in 9 appearances. For the 2011 season, Hernández played with the AZL Giants, pitching to a 8.40 ERA with 15 strikeouts in as many innings pitched. The following year, Hernández returned to the team, logging a 4.50 ERA with 19 strikeouts in 11 appearances. In 2013, Hernández spent his third straight year with the AZL Giants, registering a n ugly 10.57 ERA in 10 appearances. Hernández missed the entire 2014 season due to a right shoulder strain and was released by the Giants organization on March 9, 2015.

Frontier Greys
On April 4, 2015, Hernández signed with the Frontier Greys of the independent Frontier League. Hernández made 2 appearances for the Greys in 2015, pitching 2.0 scoreless innings with 5 strikeouts.

Arizona Diamondbacks
On May 21, 2015, Hernández signed a minor league contract with the Arizona Diamondbacks organization. He was assigned to the Low-A Hillsboro Hops, where he recorded a 6.04 ERA with 32 strikeouts in 22.1 innings of work across 22 appearances.

Cincinnati Reds
On December 10, 2015, Hernández was selected with the 1st overall pick in the minor league phase of the Rule 5 draft by the Cincinnati Reds organization. He split the 2016 season between the Single-A Dayton Dragons and the High-A Daytona Tortugas, posting a cumulative 3-2 record and 2.18 ERA in 43 appearances. The Reds added Hernández to their 40-man roster after the 2016 season. Hernández was promoted to the major leagues for the first time by the Reds on April 23, 2017. He made his major league debut the next day, pitching 2 2/3 perfect innings with 5 strikeouts in an 11-7 loss to the Milwaukee Brewers. He split his rookie season between the Double-A Pensacola Blue Wahoos, the Triple-A Louisville Bats, and the Reds, recording a 5.18 ERA in 19 big league games with Cincinnati. He was assigned to Double-A Pensacola to begin the 2018 season, and pitched 3.1 scoreless innings before he was designated for assignment on April 13, 2018.

Los Angeles Dodgers
On April 17, 2018, the Reds traded Hernández to the Los Angeles Dodgers in exchange for Zach Neal and Ibandel Isabel. He split time between the Double-A Tulsa Drillers and the Triple-A Oklahoma City Dodgers, posting a 4-2 record with 29 strikeouts between the two teams. On July 31, 2018, Hernández was designated for assignment by the Dodgers.

Milwaukee Brewers
On August 7, 2018, Hernández was claimed off waivers by the Milwaukee Brewers and assigned to the Triple-A Colorado Springs Sky Sox. On August 30, Hernández was designated for assignment by the Brewers. He finished the year with Colorado Springs, posting a 6.75 ERA in 5 games before becoming a free agent on November 2, 2018.

Texas Rangers
On December 18, 2018, Hernández signed a minor league contract with the Texas Rangers organization. He was assigned to the Triple-A Nashville Sounds to begin the 2019 season, but appeared in just four games due to injury. On October 11, 2019, Hernández was released by the Rangers organization.

References

External links

1992 births
Living people
Arizona League Giants players
Cincinnati Reds players
Colorado Springs Sky Sox players
Dayton Dragons players
Daytona Tortugas players
Dominican Republic expatriate baseball players in the United States
Dominican Republic national baseball team players
Dominican Summer League Giants players
Frontier Greys players
Hillsboro Hops players
Leones del Escogido players
Major League Baseball pitchers
Major League Baseball players from the Dominican Republic
Nashville Sounds players
Oklahoma City Dodgers players
Pensacola Blue Wahoos players
Sportspeople from Santo Domingo
Tulsa Drillers players
2019 WBSC Premier12 players